No Worries is a 1994 film directed by David Elfick. It was based on a play Elfick had seen in the 1980s.

References

External links

No Worries at Palm Beach Pictures
No Worries at Oz Movies

Australian drama films
Films produced by Eric Fellner
1994 films
1990s English-language films
1990s Australian films